Cricket is the most popular sport in Sri Lanka. Sri Lanka is one of the twelve nations that take part in Test cricket and one of the six nations that has won a cricket World Cup. Cricket is played at professional, semi-professional and recreational levels in the country and international cricket matches are watched with interest by a large proportion of the population.

Sri Lanka (then called Ceylon) was occupied by the British in 1796 and became a British colony in 1815. As in all places that the British arrived in large numbers, cricket soon followed and it is reasonable to assume that the game was first played on the island by 1800. The earliest definite mention of cricket in Ceylon was a report in the Colombo Journal on 5 September 1832 which called for the formation of a cricket club. The Colombo Cricket Club was formed soon afterwards and matches began in November 1832. Since then, the sport has grown domestically with major events such as the Premier Trophy (dating from 1938) and the Premier Limited Overs Tournament (starting 1988–89). Sri Lanka's one day international debut came in the 1975 Cricket World Cup. The country was awarded Test cricket status by the International Cricket Council in 1981.

Governing body

Sri Lanka Cricket, formerly the Board for Cricket Control in Sri Lanka (BCCSL), is the controlling body for cricket in Sri Lanka. It operates the Sri Lankan cricket team, Sri Lanka A cricket team, Sri Lankan women's cricket team and first-class cricket within Sri Lanka.
Sri Lanka is a full member of the International Cricket Council and the Asian Cricket Council. Sri Lanka co-hosted the 1996 Cricket World Cup and the 2011 Cricket World Cup.

Domestic competitions
Sri Lanka Cricket oversees the progress and handling of the major domestic competitions: the First-class tournaments – SLC Tier A and B Premier Trophy, the List A tournament – Premier Limited Overs Tournament and the Twenty20 competition – SLC Twenty20 Tournament, in which the following first-class teams may take part:

Badureliya Sports Club (Maggona)
Bloomfield Cricket and Athletic Club (Colombo)
Burgher Recreation Club (Colombo)
Chilaw Marians Cricket Club (Colombo)
Colombo Cricket Club (Colombo)
Colts Cricket Club (Colombo)
Galle Cricket Club (Galle)
Kalutara Town Club (Kalutara)
Kandy Customs Cricket Club (Kandy)
Kurunegala Youth Cricket Club (Kurunegala)
Lankan Cricket Club (Colombo)
Moors Sports Club (Colombo)
Negombo Cricket Club (Negombo
Nondescripts Cricket Club (Colombo)
Nugegoda Sports and Welfare Club (Nugegoda)
Panadura Sports Club (Panadura)
Police Sports Club (Colombo)
Ragama Cricket Club (Ragama)
Saracens Sports Club (Colombo)
Sinhalese Sports Club (Colombo)
Sri Lanka Air Force Sports Club (Katunayake)
Sri Lanka Army Sports Club (Panagoda)
Sri Lanka Navy Sports Club (Welisara)
Sri Lanka Ports Authority Cricket Club (Seeduwa)
Tamil Union Cricket and Athletic Club (Colombo)

Several competitions have been arranged where teams were formed out of each of the major provinces, independent to the above clubs:
 Inter-Provincial Cricket, established 1990, currently with 5 teams (Basnahira North, Basnahira South, Kandurata, Ruhuna, and Wayamba)
 Super Four Provincial, established 2017, currently with 4 teams (Colombo, Dambulla, Galle, and Kandy)

National cricket team

The Sri Lankan cricket team is the national cricket team of Sri Lanka. The team first played One day international cricket in the 1975 Cricket World Cup and were later awarded Test status in 1981, which made Sri Lanka the eighth Test cricket playing nation.

The Sri Lankan team transformed themselves from the underdog status to a leading cricketing nation during the 1990s. Sri Lanka currently holds the record for the highest Team total in Test Cricket

Sri Lanka have won the Cricket World Cup in 1996, the ICC Champions Trophy in 2002 (Co-champions with India), the ICC World Twenty20 in 2014.

They are also Six times champions of Asia Cup in 1986, 1997, 2004, 2008, 2014 & 2022 and have been runners up in the 2007 Cricket World Cup, 2011 Cricket World Cup, 2009 ICC World Twenty20 and 2012 ICC World Twenty20.

Women's cricket team

The Sri Lankan women's cricket team is the team that represents Sri Lanka in international women's cricket matches. Sri Lankan women's cricket team's international debut came in 1997 with a three match ODI series against the Netherlands. Since then, the team has represented Sri Lanka in international women's cricket tournaments.

See also
 Royal-Thomian
 Dharmaraja–Kingswood
 Maliyadeva-St Anne's
 Big Match
 Sri Lankan national cricket captains
 List of Sri Lankan Test cricket records
 List of Sri Lankan One Day International cricket records

References

External links
List of Sri Lankan Cricketers
Official Home of Sri Lanka Cricket
Cric Info – Sri Lanka
SL Cricket – A Forum for Sri Lankan Cricket fans to be
Island Cricket – A Sri Lanka Cricket fan site powered by User Generated Media